In mathematics, finite-dimensional distributions are a tool in the study of measures and stochastic processes. A lot of information can be gained by studying the "projection" of a measure (or process) onto a finite-dimensional vector space (or finite collection of times).

Finite-dimensional distributions of a measure
Let  be a measure space.

Finite-dimensional distributions of a stochastic process
Let  be a probability space and let  be a stochastic process.

Very often, this condition is stated in terms of measurable rectangles:

In general, this is an infinite-dimensional space.

is the natural "evaluate at times " function.

Relation to tightness

See also
 Law (stochastic processes)

Measure theory
Stochastic processes